Shahi Mosque is a historic 17th century mosque located in Chiniot, Punjab, Pakistan. It was built under supervision of Mughal Grand Vizier Saadullah Khan.

See also
 Islam in Pakistan

References

Chiniot District
Buildings and structures completed in 1655
Mosques in Punjab, Pakistan